Charles Dawson (11 July 1864 – 10 August 1916) was a British amateur archaeologist who claimed to have made a number of archaeological and palaeontological discoveries that were later exposed as frauds. These forgeries included the Piltdown Man (Eoanthropus dawsoni), a unique set of bones that he found in 1912 in Sussex. Many technological methods such as fluorine testing indicate that this discovery was a hoax and Dawson, the only one with the skill and knowledge to generate this forgery, was a major suspect.

The eldest of three sons, Dawson moved with his family from Preston, Lancashire, to Hastings, Sussex, when he was still very young. Charles initially studied as a lawyer following his father and then pursued a hobby of collecting and studying fossils.

He made a number of seemingly important fossil finds. Amongst these were teeth from a previously unknown species of mammal, later named Plagiaulax dawsoni in his honour; three new species of dinosaur, one later named Iguanodon dawsoni; and a new form of fossil plant, Salaginella dawsoni. The British Museum awarded him the title of 'Honorary Collector.' He was then elected fellow of the Geological Society for his discoveries and a few years later, he joined the Society of Antiquaries of London. Dawson died prematurely from pernicious anaemia in 1916 at Lewes, Sussex.

Alleged discoveries 
In 1889, Dawson was a co-founder of the Hastings and St Leonards Museum Association, one of the first voluntary museum friends' groups organized in Britain. Dawson worked on a voluntary basis as a member of the Museum Committee, in charge of the acquisition of artifacts and historical documents. His interest in archaeology developed and he had an uncanny knack for making spectacular discoveries, leading The Sussex Daily News to name him the "Wizard of Sussex".

In 1893, Dawson investigated a curious flint mine full of prehistoric, Roman and medieval artifacts in the Lavant Caves, near Chichester, and probed two tunnels beneath Hastings Castle. In the same year, he presented the British Museum with a Roman statuette from Beauport Park that was made, uniquely for the period, of cast iron. Other discoveries followed, including a strange form of hafted Neolithic stone axe and a well-preserved ancient timber boat.

He analyzed ancient quarries, re-examined the Bayeux Tapestry, and produced the first conclusive study of Hastings Castle. He later found fake evidence for the final phases of Roman occupation in Britain at Pevensey Castle in Sussex. Investigating unusual elements of the natural world, Dawson presented a petrified toad inside a flint nodule, discovered a large supply of natural gas at Heathfield in East Sussex, reported on a sea-serpent in the English Channel, observed a new species of human, and found a strange goldfish/carp hybrid. It was even reported that he was experimenting with phosphorescent bullets as a hindrance to Zeppelin attacks on London during the First World War.

In appreciation for the donation of fossils Dawson provided to the British Museum, he was given the title of 'Honorary Collector' and in 1885, he was elected a fellow of the Geological Society as a result of his numerous discoveries. He was then elected a fellow of the Society of Antiquaries of London in 1895. He was now Charles Dawson F.G.S., F.S.A at the age of 31, without a university degree to his name. Dawson died without receiving a knighthood.

His most famous 'find' was the 1912 discovery of the Piltdown Man which was billed as the "missing link" between humans and other great apes. Following his death in 1916, no further 'discoveries' were made at Piltdown. Questions about the Piltdown find were raised from the beginning, first by Arthur Keith, but also by palaeontologists and anatomists from the United States and Europe. Defence of the fossils was led by Arthur Smith Woodward at the Natural History Museum in London. The debate was rancorous at times and the response to those disputing the finds often became personally abusive. Challenges to Piltdown Man arose again in the 1920s, but were again dismissed.

Posthumous analysis 
In 1949, further questions were raised about the Piltdown Man and its authenticity, which led to the conclusive demonstration that Piltdown was a hoax in 1953. Since then, a number of Dawson's other finds have also been shown to be forged or planted.

In 2003, Miles Russell of Bournemouth University published the results of his investigation into Dawson's antiquarian collection and concluded that at least 38 specimens were clear fakes. Russell has noted that Dawson's whole academic career appears to have been "one built upon deceit, sleight of hand, fraud and deception, the ultimate gain being international recognition." Among these were the teeth of a reptile/mammal hybrid, Plagiaulax dawsoni, "found" in 1891 (and whose teeth had been filed down in the same way that the teeth of Piltdown Man were to be some 20 years later); the so-called "shadow figures" on the walls of Hastings Castle; a unique hafted stone axe; the Bexhill boat (a hybrid seafaring vessel); the Pevensey bricks (allegedly the latest datable "finds" from Roman Britain); the contents of the Lavant Caves (a fraudulent "flint mine"); the Beauport Park "Roman" statuette (a hybrid iron object); the Bulverhythe Hammer (shaped with an iron knife in the same way as the Piltdown elephant bone implement would later be); a fraudulent "Chinese" bronze vase; the Brighton "Toad in the Hole" (a toad entombed within a flint nodule); the English Channel sea serpent; the Uckfield Horseshoe (another hybrid iron object) and the Lewes Prick Spur. Of his antiquarian publications, most demonstrate evidence of plagiarism or at least naive referencing as Russell wrote: "Piltdown was not a 'one-off' hoax, more the culmination of a life's work."

Piltdown Man 

Dawson claimed to have discovered a collection of fossils that have been dug up in Piltdown, Sussex, including an ape-like jawbone and a human-like skull. However, after his death, it was proven that the remains were evidently forged. For years, the creator of these remains was unknown, though it was then determined, through a meticulous inspection of his finds and collections, that Charles Dawson was most likely responsible for this forgery.

Unmasking the hoax 
As more human fossils were discovered, it appeared that they had little similarities with the Piltdown Man. The Piltdown Man was then re-examined through new, rigorous technological methods which ultimately uncovered the hoax. Fluoride-based tests, chemical tests that date fossils by the amount of fluorine buried bones absorb from the soil, were used to date the Piltdown remains. This test, validated by a nitrogen-based test, dated the skull to not more than 50,000 years old, far more recent than Dawson proposed, and dated the jawbone to decades old. This meant that the Piltdown Man could not have been an ancestor of modern humans. Furthermore, chemical tests displayed that the fossils had been artificially stained by iron and chromium to appear medieval. Also, CT scans used to analyzed the inside of the bones indicated that many bones were loaded with gravel and were then sealed with putty. Even more so, X-rays indicate that the teeth have been flattened by filing or grinding to appear like human teeth. Lastly, in 2016, a team of British researchers used DNA studies to provide added evidence for the provenance of Piltdown Man. It was determined that the Piltdown I jawbone and the Piltdown II molar tooth came from a single orangutan and the cranial bones came from primitive humans. Despite the consistency of the findings, analyses of the material exhibit the forger was not trained professionally as the materials had fractured bones, putty that set too fast, and cracked teeth.

Revealing the forger 
Most agree that the Piltdown Man was forged by a single individual, and that this was most probably Charles Dawson. Dawson was the suspected perpetrator in this hoax for many reasons. First, Dawson had previous history of deception: he was responsible for about 38 forgeries, plagiarized a historical account of Hastings Castle, and had pretended to act on behalf of the Sussex Archeological Society. However, most people were unaware of this. Second, he was majorly involved in the Piltdown findings. He initiated the story of the Piltdown finds and was the one who contacted Woodward about them. He was the sole person to have seen the Piltdown II site and never disclosed the facts about this site; the fact that the techniques used to create both Piltdown I and Piltdown II were so similar suggests a single forger. Also, he was the only person present at every discovery; nothing was ever discovered at the site when he was not physically present and no other fossils were found after he died. Third, not only did he have access to the museum and antiquarian shops that carried these objects, he was also a popular collector, an amazing networker, and knew what the British scientific community expected in a missing link between apes and humans.

It has been suggested that Dawson's motive for this forgery had been his strong desire for scientific recognition and to join the archeological Royal Society. Between 1883 and 1909, Dawson wrote 50 publications though none were important enough to elevate his career. In 1909, he wrote a letter to Smith Woodward, with an unhappy heart, saying that he wanted to uncover a significant discovery though he never seems to come across one. Just six weeks later, Dawson's wife wrote a letter to the Home Secretary, pleading on behalf of Dawson's expertise. Sorrowful that he never unearthed a major discovery, he created the Piltdown Man which resulted in his election to the Royal Society.

Although there is not a substantial amount of evidence, many believe that he received aid from other experts such as Teilhard de Chardin, who worked with Dawson on early excavations, and Sir Arthur Smith Woodward who is Keeper of the Department at the Natural History Museum, friend of Dawson, and co-author of the announcement of Piltdown II.

References

Sources

 De Groote, Isabelle, et al (2016). "New genetic and morphological evidence suggests a single hoaxer created 'Piltdown man'." Royal Society.
 Donovan, Stephen K (2016). "The triumph of the Dawsonian method." Proceedings of the Geologists' Association.
 Langdon, J.H. (2016). "Case Study 4. Self-Correcting Science: The Piltdown Forgery." In: The Science of Human Evolution. Springer, Cham.
 Oakley, Kenneth P., and J. S. Weiner (1995). “Piltdown Man.” Sigma Xi, The Scientific Research Honor Society.
 Ormrod, Tess (2012). "New fossils from a classic area: the Builth Inlier." Hastings & District Geological Society Journal.
 Russell, Miles (2003). "Charles Dawson: 'The Piltdown faker'." BBC News.
 Russell, Miles (2003). Piltdown Man: The Secret Life of Charles Dawson. Stroud: Tempus
 
 
 
 Thomson, Keith Stewart (1991). “Marginalia: Piltdown Man: The Great English Mystery Story.” Sigma Xi, The Scientific Research Honor Society.

Further reading

External links
 Project Piltdown at Bournemouth University
 Archive of Piltdown-related papers at Clark University
 Annotated bibliography of Piltdown Man materials by T. H. Turrittin – See especially section 15 related to Charles Dawson
 Reevaluation of a supposedly Roman iron figure found by Charles Dawson, but later determined not to be Roman
 
 Web pages and timeline about the Piltdown forgery hosted by the British Geological Survey
 "Piltdown review points decisive finger at forger Dawson" BBC News

1864 births
1916 deaths
Amateur archaeologists
Deaths from sepsis
Pseudoarchaeologists
Archaeological forgery
Forgers
Hoaxers
Writers from Preston, Lancashire